The Vale of Clwyd is a constituency of the Senedd. It elects one Member of the Senedd by the first past the post method of election. Also, however, it is one of nine constituencies in the North Wales electoral region, which elects four additional members, in addition to nine constituency members, to produce a degree of proportional representation for the region as a whole.

Boundaries 

The constituency was created for the first election to the Assembly, in 1999, with the name and boundaries of the Vale of Clwyd Westminster constituency. It is entirely within the preserved county of Clwyd. From the 2007 Assembly election, the constituency has included an area currently within the Clwyd West constituency. For Westminster purposes, the same boundary change became effective for the 2010 United Kingdom general election.

When created in 1999, the North Wales region included the constituencies of Alyn and Deeside, Caernarfon, Clwyd South, Clwyd West, Delyn, Vale of Clwyd, Wrexham and Ynys Môn.

Since the 2007 Assembly election, the region includes Aberconwy, Alyn and Deeside, Arfon, Clwyd South, Conwy, Delyn, Vale of Clwyd, Wrexham and Ynys Môn.

Voting 
In elections for the Senedd, each voter has two votes. The first vote may be used to vote for a candidate to become the Member of the Senedd for the voter's constituency, elected by the first past the post system. The second vote may be used to vote for a regional closed party list of candidates. Additional member seats are allocated from the lists by the d'Hondt method, with constituency results being taken into account in the allocation.

Members of the Senedd

Elections

Elections in the 2020s

Elections in the 2010s 

Regional ballots rejected: 186

Elections in the 2000s 

2003 Electorate: 49,319
Regional ballots rejected: 534

Elections in the 1990s

See also 
 North Wales (Senedd electoral region)
 Senedd constituencies and electoral regions

References

External links 
 Vale of Clwyd Lib Dems Blog

Senedd constituencies in the North Wales electoral region
1999 establishments in Wales
Constituencies established in 1999